Koschmin can refer to

Kreis Koschmin, an administrative district of Prussia
 Koschmin, now Koźmin, Szamotuły County, a former village of Prussia now in Poland
 Koschmin, now Koźminek, Lubusz_Voivodeship, also a former village of Prussia now in Poland
 Koschmin, now Koźmin Wielkopolski in Poland; former seat of Kreis Koschmin